= Márcio Labre =

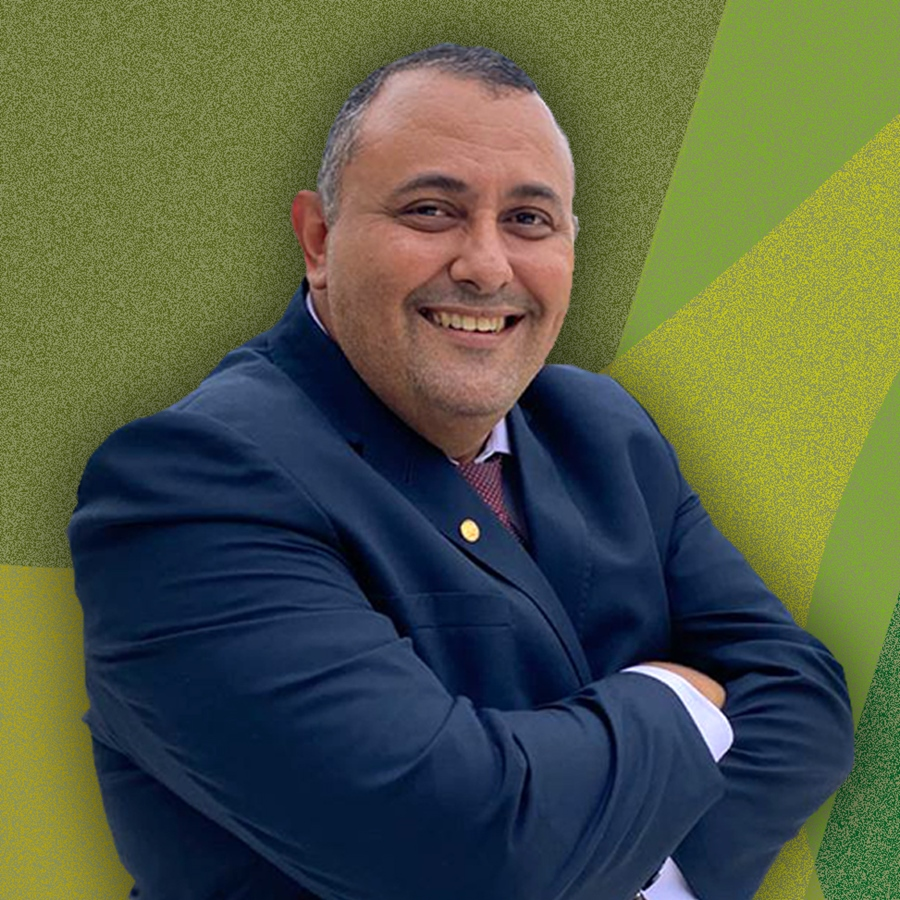
Deputy Márcio Labre in 2020

Márcio da Silveira Labre (born in Rio de Janeiro on February 27, 1974) is a Brazilian deputy for the state of Rio de Janeiro. He is affiliated with Liberal Party (PL). He was elected in 2018.
